Cape Spencer-Smith is the northernmost cape of White Island, in the Ross Archipelago. Named by the New Zealand Geological Survey Antarctic Expedition (NZGSAE) (1958–59) for the Rev. Arnold Spencer-Smith, chaplain with the Ross Sea Party of the Imperial Trans-Antarctic Expedition (1914–17), who died on March 9, 1916, on the return journey after laying the depots to Mount Hope for Shackleton's party. He had suffered from scurvy and had been carried for 40 days on a sledge by his companions prior to his death.  It is separated from Ross Island by Haskell Strait.

References

Headlands of Victoria Land
Scott Coast